Dizaj Khalil (also Romanized as Dīzaj Khalīl and Dīzaj-e Khalīl; also known as Dīza-Khalīl, Dizeh, and Dizeh Khalīl) is a village in Guney-ye Sharqi Rural District, in the Central District of Shabestar County, East Azerbaijan Province, Iran. At the 2011 census, its population was 4,048, in 1,203 families.

References 

Populated places in Shabestar County